Ondougou or Onjougou (ɔ̀njɔ́gɔ̀) is a rural commune in the Cercle of Bandiagara in the Mopti Region of Mali. The commune contains nine villages and in the 2009 census had a population of 7,182. The main village (chef-lieu) is Banakane. Goundaka is located near Ondougou.

Mombo is spoken in Ondougou.

References

External links
.

Communes of Mopti Region